The Bilibino Nuclear Power Plant ( []) is a power plant in Bilibino, Chukotka Autonomous Okrug, Russia. The plant is equipped with four EGP-6 reactors. The plant is the smallest and the second northernmost operating nuclear power plant in the world. Plans to begin a shutdown procedure of the plant in 2019 have been announced, and it will be replaced by the floating nuclear power station Akademik Lomonosov.

Radiation exposure 
As of 2012, the EGP-6 reactors at the plant exposed personnel and staff on average to 3.7 mSv/year. This makes up 18.5% of the 20 mSv/year designated radiation workers can receive. The exposure by the Bilibino Nuclear Power Plant is higher than the average for Russian nuclear power plants which sits at 1.26 mSv/year.

Improvements since the Fukushima-Daiichi accident 
Following the 2011 Fukushima nuclear disaster, measures were taken to ensure safety and emergency responses for Russian nuclear power plants. These plants included RBMK, BN, WWER-440, WWER-1000, and EGP reactors. For nuclear power plants with EGP's, mobile pumping sets, motor-driven pumps, 0.2 MW mobile diesel generator units (MDGU), and 2 MW diesel generator plants (MDGP) had been supplied for mobile emergency response. Seismic protection systems (SSP) were introduced. The "Management Guide for Beyond Design Basis Accidents at RMBK NPPs Including Severe Accidents", a guide for prevention and mitigation for a accidents concerning graphite-moderated reactors, was revised with the incidents of Fukushima in mind.

References

External links

Current website at Rosenergoatom
Operational information of Bilinibo NPP at Energoatom

Nuclear power stations in Russia
Nuclear power stations built in the Soviet Union